The 1998 Vuelta a España was the 53rd edition of the Vuelta a España, one of cycling's Grand Tours. The Vuelta began in Córdoba on 5 September, and Stage 11 occurred on 16 September with a stage to Cerler. The race finished in Madrid on 27 September.

Stage 1
5 September 1998 — Córdoba to Córdoba,

Stage 2
6 September 1998 — Córdoba to Cádiz,

Stage 3
7 September 1998 — Cádiz to Estepona,

Stage 4
8 September 1998 — Málaga to Granada,

Stage 5
9 September 1998 — Olula del Río to Murcia,

Stage 6
10 September 1998 — Murcia to Xorret de Catí,

Stage 7
11 September 1998 — Alicante to Valencia,

Stage 8
12 September 1998 — Palma de Mallorca to Palma de Mallorca,

Stage 9
13 September 1998 — Alcúdia to Alcúdia,  (ITT)

Rest day
14 September 1998 — Province of Barcelona

Stage 10
15 September 1998 — Vic to Estación de Pal,

Stage 11
16 September 1998 — Andorra la Vella to Cerler,

References

1998 Vuelta a España
Vuelta a España stages